Hurricane Ethel was one of two major hurricanes in the 1960 Atlantic hurricane season. The sixth known tropical cyclone, fifth named storm, and fourth hurricane of the season, Ethel developed from a disturbance in the Gulf of Mexico on September 14. After becoming a tropical storm, Ethel rapidly intensified and became a hurricane six hours later. By early on September 15, the storm reached major hurricane intensity when it became a Category 3 hurricane on the Saffir–Simpson hurricane scale. However, shortly thereafter, Ethel rapidly weakened back to a Category 1 hurricane while brushing eastern Louisiana. Later on September 15, Ethel weakened to a tropical storm. Early on the following day, Ethel made landfall in Pascagoula, Mississippi. The storm gradually weakened inland, before eventually dissipating over southern Kentucky on September 17.

In Louisiana, the western edge of the storm produced light rainfall and hurricane-force winds, though no damage occurred in that state. Offshore of Mississippi, rough seas inundated Horn Island and split Ship Island. Tropical storm force winds in the southern portion of the state littered broken glass, trees, and signs across streets in Pascagoula, as well as down power lines, which caused some residents to lose electricity. In Alabama, winds damaged beach cottages in cities along the Gulf Coast, and damaged crops in five counties in the southern portion of the state. Although large amounts of precipitation fell in the extreme western portions of the state, no flooding occurred in Florida. A lightning strike to a power station near Tallahassee caused a brief citywide blackout. The storm spawned five tornadoes in Florida and Alabama, one of which destroyed 25 homes. Outside the Gulf Coast of the United States, rain fell in other states, but no damage is known to have occurred. Overall, Ethel caused 1 fatality and $1.5 million (1960 USD) in damage.

Meteorological history

Hurricane Ethel originated from a small tropical disturbance over the Gulf of Mexico on the morning of September 14, 1960. The disturbance quickly developed within a region favoring intensification and the New Orleans Hurricane Warning Office issued their first advisory on the system, classifying it as an area of low pressure, at 1500 UTC. Roughly six hours after becoming a tropical storm, Ethel was upgraded to a hurricane as it underwent an intense phase of explosive deepening. Ethel further intensified into a major hurricane, as it approached the Gulf Coast of the United States.

Following a pass through the storm by a United States Navy reconnaissance plane, Ethel was declared a "severe hurricane" with winds reaching , equivalent to a modern-day Category 3 hurricane on the Saffir–Simpson hurricane scale. At the time these winds were measured, a barometric pressure of 974 mbar (hPa; 28.7 inHg) was recorded, the lowest in relation to the hurricane. However, shortly thereafter, cool, dry air began to entrain the storm, causing it to rapidly weaken.

As Ethel neared landfall, forecasters within the United States Weather Bureau were unsure of the future track and intensity of the hurricane due to the unusual strengthening and weakening. Continuing northward, the hurricane further weakened to a tropical storm as it was approaching the Gulf Coast of the United States. Gradual weakening took place as the storm moved inland over Mississippi and by 1800 UTC on September 16, Ethel was further downgraded to a tropical depression. The remnants of the former hurricane continued moving towards the north-northwest before dissipating on September 17 over southern Kentucky.

Preparations
Prior to Ethel's arrival, adequate warning allowed roughly 12,000 residents along the Mississippi coastline to evacuate to shelters, set up at churches and schools. Along a  stretch of the Gulf Coastline, all fishing villages fully evacuated to safer places. In Louisiana, at least 2,000 people had been evacuated from Grand Isle. Other towns were placed under emergency evacuations where Coast Guard boats were used to move residents to safer areas. Military aircraft were also moved from Keesler Air Force Base to other airfields across the country. Numerous schools and businesses were closed on September 15 in fears of a worst-case scenario, a storm with  winds passing directly over Mobile, Alabama, a city of roughly 150,000 people. In Florida, the National Weather Bureau stated that preparations were not being undertaken fast enough nor as extensive as warranted. According to the Red Cross, 48,000 people in the threatened region sought refuge in shelters; civil defense stated that 65,000 residents moved to shelters.

Impact

Before the storm weakened rapidly, people feared a large storm surge over much of southeastern Louisiana. Preparing for the storm induced stress, which in one person contributed a fatal heart attack. In Louisiana, a compact, rapidly weakening Hurricane Ethel brought significant wind and rain primarily east and southeast of New Orleans. However, the storm caused a maximum surge of only . Although Ethel weakened significantly, the hurricane still lashed far southeastern Louisiana. At the United States Coast Guard station in Quarantine in Plaquemines Parish, Louisiana, sustained winds reached .

Hurricane Ethel caused substantial beach erosion throughout the barrier islands of Mississippi but brought a relatively small storm surge of  along the populated coastline. Roughly  of the east end of Horn Island was lost. The storm also split Ship Island into two islands, east and west Ship Islands. However, few knew of this split until Hurricane Camille in 1969 Atlantic hurricane season substantially widened the split. Throughout the Mississippi Gulf Coast, winds reached gusts approached . In Pascagoula, Mississippi, broken glass, fallen trees and signs covered the streets. Several areas were also flooded and power was lost in area where power lines were downed by high winds. Following the storm, Governor of Mississippi Ross Barnett ordered 100 Mississippi National Guard to Pascagoula and requested other troops in other areas.

Slight damage to beach cottages occurred in Dauphin Island and Gulf Shores and along Mobile Bay. Minor crop losses were reported in Clarke, Escambia, Mobile, Monroe, and Washington counties. An F2 tornado also injured two people in the town of Mignon.

Hurricane Ethel also brought heavy rains and strong winds to much of the Florida Panhandle. Hurricane Donna struck Tampa, Florida, particularly hard earlier in the month, causing major flooding of Hillsborough River (Florida) at Zephyrhills, Florida on 12 September. People feared severe flooding of the Hillsborough River into Tampa, which did not occur. According to Florida Highway Patrol, Ethel directly caused damage of $100,000 (1960 USD) in the state. Additionally Ethel spawned four tornadoes in Florida, one of which reached F2 intensity and damaged or destroyed 25 homes near Panama City.

Beyond the Gulf Coast of the United States, Ethel dropped rainfall in the states of Georgia, South Carolina, North Carolina, causing little if any damage. Throughout its path, Ethel caused $1.5 million (1960 USD) in damage and one indirect fatality.

See also

 List of Category 3 Atlantic hurricanes
 Other storms of the same name
 1916 Gulf Coast hurricane – A Category 3 hurricane that devastated similar areas
 Hurricane Isaac (2012) – Impacted southeastern Louisiana as a Category 1 hurricane, causing widespread damage
 Hurricane Nate (2017) – A Category 1 hurricane that impacted similar areas

References

External links
 1960 hurricane season review (PDF format)

1960 Atlantic hurricane season
Category 3 Atlantic hurricanes
Hurricanes in Louisiana
Hurricanes in Mississippi
1960 natural disasters in the United States